Tappeh Kabud-e Sofla (also Romanized as Tappeh Kabūd-e Soflá; also known as Tappeh Kabūd-e Pā’īn) is a village in Jeygaran Rural District, Ozgoleh District, Salas-e Babajani County, Kermanshah Province, Iran. At the 2006 census, its population was 307, in 57 families.

References 

Populated places in Salas-e Babajani County